Oncomelania minima is a species of freshwater snail, an aquatic gastropod mollusk in the family Pomatiopsidae.

Distribution 

This species occurs in Ishikawa Prefecture and in Sado Island, Niigata Prefecture, Japan.

It is Vulnerable species in Japan.

Ecology 

Oncomelania minima is a freshwater species which inhabits mountain streamlets.

References

External links 

Pomatiopsidae
Gastropods described in 1936